Keelesdale is an underground light rail transit (LRT) station under construction on Line 5 Eglinton, a new line that will be part of the Toronto subway system. It will be located in the Silverthorn neighbourhood at the intersection of Keele Street and Eglinton Avenue and is scheduled to open in 2023. Nearby destinations include the York Civic Centre, Keelesdale Park and Chris Tonks Arena, York Memorial Collegiate Institute, George Harvey Collegiate Institute, and the Silverthorn neighbourhood.

The primary entrance and an off-street bus loop are located at the northeast corner of Eglinton Avenue and Trethewey Drive. A secondary entrance is located on the northwest corner of Eglinton Avenue and Trethewey Drive adjacent to York Memorial Collegiate. A third entrance is located at the southeast corner of Eglinton Avenue and Keele Street. The primary entrance will be fully accessible and have a station plaza with a landscaped public space. The station will have four bus bays plus on-street connections for TTC buses. Noise attenuation walls will be placed between the bus bays and neighbouring houses. There will be outdoor parking for 60 bicycles.

During the planning stages for Line 5 Eglinton, the station was given the working name "Keele", which is identical to the pre-existing Keele station on Line 2 Bloor–Danforth. On November 23, 2015, a report to the TTC Board recommended giving a unique name to each station in the subway system (including Line 5 Eglinton). Thus, the LRT station was renamed "Keelesdale". Silverthorn was also considered.

Before construction, land expropriations and demolitions were required. The primary entrance is at the site of former EMS Station 19 and a car wash. The secondary entrance is at the site of a former Coffee Time outlet and its adjacent parking lot.

Surface connections 

, the following are the proposed connecting routes that would serve this station when Line 5 Eglinton opens:

References

External links
Keelesdale station project page at the Eglinton Crosstown website
 

Line 5 Eglinton stations